Bobbie Jean Brown (born October 7, 1969), sometimes credited as Bobbie Brown-Lane, is an American actress, model, and former beauty pageant contestant. She appeared in the video for Warrant's song "Cherry Pie".

Early life 
Brown was born October 7, 1969, in Baton Rouge, Louisiana. She is the oldest child of Bobby Gene and Judy Ann Brown (née Faul). Brown has three siblings: a brother, a half brother, and a half sister. Her parents divorced when she was a freshman in high school and her mother later remarried. Brown attended high school at Starkey Academy in Central, Louisiana.

Career 

Brown won the Miss Louisiana Teen USA 1987 title and represented Louisiana in the Miss Teen USA 1987 pageant broadcast live from El Paso, Texas in July 1987. Brown won the spokesmodel competition on Star Search a record thirteen times. In 1990, she hosted the syndicated fashion series Preview: The Best of the New. Brown also appeared in TV shows such as Married... with Children (three episodes) and films such as 1993's Last Action Hero in which fellow Miss Teen USA Bridgette Wilson portrayed Arnold Schwarzenegger's daughter.

Brown worked as a model for Budweiser and other companies. She also appeared in music videos, including Great White's "Once Bitten, Twice Shy" and "House of Broken Love" and Hurricane's "I'm On to You", Louie Louie "Sittin' in the Lap of Luxury". She is best remembered as the girl in Warrant's "Cherry Pie" video released in 1990.

In the late 1990s, she hosted a TV infomercial that advertised the eight-CD set called "Big Rock: The 80s Generation". In 1998, she sued Penthouse for featuring a model also named Bobbie Brown. In 2009, Brown wrote and hosted the VH1 documentary series, "Do It for the Band: Women of the Sunset Strip".

In 2012, Brown joined the cast of the reality show Ex-Wives of Rock, airing on the Fuse network. In November 2013, Brown's memoir co-written with Caroline Ryder and titled Dirty Rocker Boys: Love and Lust on the Sunset Strip, was published by Gallery Books, a division of Simon & Schuster, Inc. Brown used to run an online clothing store bobbiejeanbrown.net, though the site is currently offline.

In 2016, Brown appeared as Lexxi's mother in Live from Lexxi's Mom's Garage and also is on the album cover, an acoustic live DVD by Steel Panther, and also appeared in their music video for "She's Tight".

Personal life 
In her 2013 memoirs, Brown admitted that she was a cocaine and methamphetamine addict for a decade. Brown used the latter to drop weight quickly before modeling shoots. She completed several stints in rehab before finally becoming sober in the 2000s. Brown also revealed that she suffers from trichotillomania, a compulsive hair-pulling disorder, which she developed in 2005 while she was involved in what she called "the worst relationship of my entire life".

During the shooting of Warrant's "Cherry Pie" video, Brown met lead singer Jani Lane. Lane and Brown married on July 15, 1991. They had a daughter, Taylar Jayne Lane, in 1992, and divorced in 1993. After her divorce from Lane, Brown was engaged to Mötley Crüe drummer Tommy Lee. They broke up in February 1995, as Lee married Pamela Anderson four days later. Brown has been in a relationship with rocker Joshua Bissell of the band Joy Island since 2014.

Author 
Brown co-wrote an autobiography, Dirty Rocker Boys, with Caroline Ryder which was published in 2013.

Filmography

References

External links 

1969 births
20th-century American actresses
21st-century American businesspeople
Actresses from Baton Rouge, Louisiana
American autobiographers
American fashion businesspeople
Female models from Louisiana
American film actresses
American memoirists
American television actresses
Living people
20th-century Miss Teen USA delegates
Participants in American reality television series
Women autobiographers
American women memoirists
21st-century American businesswomen